Archibald Campbell, 1st Duke of Argyll, 10th Earl of Argyll (25 July 1658 – September 1703) was a Scottish peer.

Biography
The eldest son of Archibald Campbell, 9th Earl of Argyll and Mary Stuart, daughter of James Stuart, 4th Earl of Moray, Campbell sought to recover his father's estates (by gaining King James VII's favour). However, after failing to do so, he went to The Hague and supported William and Mary's quest for the throne; this important support later led to the monarchs returning his father's estate in 1690. In spite of the attainder, he was admitted in 1689 to the Convention of the Estates of Scotland as earl of Argyll, and he was deputed, with Sir James Montgomery and Sir John Dalrymple, to present the crown to William in its name, and to tender him the coronation oath. Also, he was made a Privy Councillor. He was William's chief Scottish advisor, and was colonel-in-chief of the Earl of Argyll's Regiment of Foot, that was involved in the 1692 massacre of the MacDonalds of Glen Coe, but took no part in any of its field operations. In 1696 he was made a lord of the treasury, and was created a duke in 1701.

On 12 March 1678, he married Elizabeth Tollemache (daughter of Elizabeth and Sir Lionel Tollemache, 3rd Baronet) at Edinburgh, Scotland. Elizabeth's stepfather John Maitland, 1st Duke of Lauderdale was a dominant figure in Scottish politics of the era. They had four children, born at Ham House outside London:

John Campbell, 2nd Duke of Argyll (10 October 1680 – 4 October 1743)
Archibald Campbell, 3rd Duke of Argyll (June 1682 – 15 April 1761)
Lady Margaret Campbell (2 June 1690 – died bef 1703), not mentioned in father's will
Lady Anne Campbell (12 Jan 1692 – 20 October 1736), m. James Stuart, 2nd Earl of Bute

The 1st Duke of Argyll is buried at Kilmun Parish Church.

References

 

1658 births
1703 deaths
17th-century Scottish landowners
British Army generals
British Life Guards officers
1
Members of the Convention of the Estates of Scotland 1689
Commissioners of the Treasury of Scotland
Earl of Argyll
Extraordinary Lords of Session
Burials at the Argyll Mausoleum
17th-century Scottish peers
18th-century Scottish landowners